Rose Green is a hamlet on the A1124 road and the River Colne, near the village of Wakes Colne in the Colchester district, in the English county of Essex.

Hamlets in Essex